Tobias Bishop of Jerusalem, was the 2nd Century, fifth Bishop of Jerusalem. He was acquainted with Thaddeus of Edessa who was involved in healing, being one of the Seventy disciples. 

According to Eusebius Tobias was a Jewish Christian born to Jewish parents, who kept the Law of the Torah.

His feast day is on Dec 17.

References

2nd-century bishops of Jerusalem
2nd-century Christian martyrs
Year of birth unknown
Saints from the Holy Land